The Rosary Sonatas (Rosenkranzsonaten, also known as the Mystery Sonatas or Copper-Engraving Sonatas) by Heinrich Ignaz Franz Biber are a collection of 15 short sonatas for violin and continuo, with a final passacaglia for solo violin. Instead of a title each has a copper-engaved vignette related to the Christian Rosary devotion practice and possibly to the Feast of the Guardian Angels.

It is presumed that the Mystery Sonatas were completed around 1676, but they were unknown until their publication in 1905. The music of Biber was never entirely forgotten due to the high technical skill required to play many of his works; this is especially true of his works for violin. Once rediscovered, the Mystery Sonatas became Biber's most widely known composition. The work is prized for its virtuosic vocal style, scordatura tunings and its programmatic structure.

History and discovery 
Biber wrote a large body of instrumental music and is most famous for his violin sonatas, but he also wrote a large amount of sacred vocal music, of which many works were polychoral (the most impressive being his Missa Salisburgensis).

In his sonatas for violin, Biber integrated new technical skills with new compositional expression and was himself able to accomplish techniques that no other known violinist could at his time. The Mystery Sonatas include very rapid passages, demanding double stops and an extended range, reaching positions on the violin that musicians had not yet been able to play.

The original and only manuscript is stored in the Bavarian State Library in Munich. There is no title page, and the manuscript begins with a dedication to his employer, Archbishop Gandolph. Because of the missing title page, it is uncertain what Biber intended the formal title of the piece to be and which instruments he intended for the accompaniment. Although scholars assume that the sonatas were probably written around the year 1676, there is evidence that they were not all written at the same time or in the same context. This means that Biber could have collected the sonatas from his previously composed works to form a collection and replaced inappropriate suites with new and descriptive compositions. However, they are assembled into a remarkably coherent large-scale form which is also relevant to the Mysteries of the Rosary.

Rosary devotion 
The 15 Mysteries of the Rosary, practiced in the so-called “Rosary processions” since the 13th century, are meditations on important moments in the life of Christ and the Virgin Mary. During these processions, believers walked around a cycle of fifteen paintings and sculptures that were placed at specific points of a church or another building. In this tradition, at every point a series of prayers was to be recited and related to the beads on the rosary (this is the reason why they are also named the Rosary Sonatas). When they performed this ritual, the faithful also listened to the corresponding biblical passages and commentaries. According to Holman, it is presumed that at the time they would listen to Biber's musical commentary to accompany this ritual of meditation.

Each sonata corresponds to one of the fifteen Mysteries and a Passacaglia for solo violin which closes the collection, possibly relating to the Feast of the Guardian Angel which, at the time, was a celebration that took place on different dates near those of the rosary processions in September and October.

Structure 
The 15 Mysteries are divided into three cycles. The 15 sonatas are organized into the same three cycles: five Joyful Mysteries, five Sorrowful Mysteries and five Glorious Mysteries. In the manuscript each of the 15 sonatas is introduced by an engraving appropriate to the devotion to the Life of Christ and the Virgin Mary.

Biber's scordatura tuning helped create music that was relevant to the themes of each mystery. Apart from the first and last sonatas, each is written with a different scordatura.
Scordatura is a technique which provides the instrument with unusual sonorities, colors, altered ranges and new harmonies made available by tuning the strings of the instrument down or up, creating different intervals between the strings than the norm. It was first used in the early 16th century and was most popular until approximately 1750. In literature for violin and viola scordatura is usually written in a way that the performer reads and plays the notated fingering as if the instrument were tuned conventionally. This means that the performer sees particular notes but hears different pitches when he or she plays, which can be both confusing and demanding to perform.

Biber uses scordatura primarily to manipulate the violin's tone color, while the creation of otherwise impossible chords and textures are a welcomed, but secondary opportunity. Through the progression of the sonatas, the difficulty of the scordatura tuning rises and falls, with the peak of difficulty located in the Sorrowful Mysteries.

The Joyful Mysteries depict episodes from the early life of Jesus, from the Annunciation to the Finding in the Temple. The last four Joyful Mysteries use tunings with sharps that create bright and resonant harmonies.

In the Sorrowful Mysteries, Biber uses scordatura tunings that tone down the violin's bright sound, creating slight dissonances and compressing the range from the lowest to the highest string. By restricting the range, the violin produces conflicting vibrations that contribute to the expression of tension in the suffering and despair from the Sweating of Blood through to the Crucifixion. The last of the Sorrowful Mysteries, the Crucifixion, uses a more sonorous tuning to underline the significance and awesome emotion within the events of Jesus' last hours of pain.

The Glorious Mysteries include the events from the Resurrection to the Assumption of the Virgin and Coronation of the Virgin. The Resurrection opens the last cycle of sonatas, with the most impressive open and sonorous tuning, underlining its otherworldly theme. The remaining four Glorious Mysteries are also composed using bright, major scordatura tunings.

The following Passacaglia in G minor uses a bass pattern which is the same as that of the first line of a hymn to the Guardian Angel. It is considered the most "outstanding work of its type before the Bach Chaconne".

Compositions 

# This table uses standard Scientific pitch notation to designate octaves. (In this system "middle C" is called C4.)

* In this unique scordatura the second and third strings are crossed below the bridge and above the top of the neck thereby switching their standard placement on the fingerboard.

In recent times 
Two recent anniversary celebrations, in 1994 celebrating 350 years since his baptism and in 2004 celebrating 300 years since his death, have led to a “renaissance” of Biber's work through concerts and other forms of presentation. Before then, the Mystery Sonatas were usually enjoyed and studied by Baroque enthusiasts. In 2004, three new recordings emerged by Andrew Manze, Pavlo Beznosiuk and Monica Huggett, showing new interest in this particular work by Biber. The newfound enthusiasm towards the Mystery Sonatas is evident in Eichler's account of Biber's scordatura usage: "Each new configuration is a secret key to an invisible door, unlocking a different set of chordal possibilities on the instrument, opening up alternative worlds of resonance and vibration".

He adds that "Manze makes the strongest impression, not only for the interpretive freedom and vitality in his account but also for the elegantly uncluttered arrangement in which he presents the music, with only keyboard accompaniment (and, on one occasion, cello)". Eichler points out that the Rosary Sonatas are often over-interpreted and taken too literally considering the uncertainty of the original context and intention, and that this restricts the listener's chance to draw from a large variety of possible meanings. Manze himself explains that the tendency of modern performers to use a large bass section as accompaniment is counterproductive to "the music's raison d'être: to evoke an intimate, private atmosphere suitable for prayer and meditation".

Eichler also suggests that the sonatas are best enjoyed when listened to from beginning to end, as a journey that is brought to life through the different varieties of sound and color that the scordatura lends to the instrument.

The Australian chamber trio Latitude 37 performed the complete Rosary Sonatas by Heinrich Ignaz Franz von Biber in April at the inaugural Brisbane Baroque festival, in April 2015.

In 2015 also, Spanish violinist, Lina Tur Bonet, along with a small orchestra for basso continuo, released her own particular interpretation of the “Mystery Sonatas”, performed with extreme accuracy and respect to the original score. It has been widely celebrated by classical music specialised international media, and awarded several prizes."

References

External links 
 
 

Compositions by Heinrich Ignaz Franz Biber
Violin sonatas
1670s in music